The Top Christmas Albums (renamed Top Holiday Albums in 2000) is a seasonal chart published weekly by Billboard during the holiday season of each year tracking the best-selling Christmas albums in the United States.

Number-one Top Christmas Albums of the 1990s

The following are the albums that reached the Number one position on the Top Christmas Album Charts before it was renamed Top Holiday Albums on November 25, 2000.

The 50 Top Christmas Albums of the 90s

These are the top 50 albums that charted from December 22, 1990 until January 15, 2000.  The survey was renamed Top Holiday Albums at the beginning of the 2000 holiday season.  The peak position reflects the highest position the album charted between December 22, 1990 until January 15, 2000.  The top 10 and total weeks include the weeks charted on the Christmas Records survey from 1963-1973 and the all the weeks charted on the Christmas Hits survey introduced in 1983.  Many of the albums continued to chart on the Top Holiday Albums chart.

See also 
 Billboard Christmas Hits 1983-1989
 Billboard Christmas Holiday Charts
 List of best-selling Christmas albums in the United States
 List of Billboard Top Holiday Albums number ones of the 2000s

References

External links 
 Current Top Holiday Albums chart at Billboard

Holiday albums
United States Holiday Albums